Sven Hanson can refer to:

 Sven Hanson (sailor) (born 1941), Swedish Olympic sailor
 Sven Hanson (swimmer) (1892-1972), Swedish Olympic swimmer